The R310 road is a regional road in County Mayo, Ireland. South to north the route connects the town of Castlebar to Ballina. En route it crosses over a strait linking Lough Conn and Lough Cullin at Pontoon, part of River Moy outflow.

See also

 List of roads of County Mayo
 National primary road
 National secondary road
 Roads in Ireland

References
Roads Act 1993 (Classification of Regional Roads) Order 2006 – Department of Transport

Regional roads in the Republic of Ireland
Roads in County Mayo